Gontscharovia is a genus of flowering plant in the family Lamiaceae, first described in 1953. It contains only one known species, Gontscharovia popovii, native to the mountains of south-central Asia (Afghanistan, Pakistan, Tajikistan, Uzbekistan and Kashmir).

References

Lamiaceae
Flora of Asia
Monotypic Lamiaceae genera